Dawson Historic District is a national historic district located at Dawson, Fayette County, Pennsylvania.  The district includes 107 contributing buildings in the central business district and surrounding residential areas of Dawson. The oldest building is the log Cochran House (c. 1820). Most of the contributing buildings were built between 1870 and 1940, and are representative of a number of popular architectural styles including Bungalow / American Craftsman, Classical Revival, and Queen Anne.  Other notable buildings include the Dawson Baptist Church (c. 1870), James Cochran House, W. H. Cochran House (1880s), Rist House (1880s), First National Bank (1897), and Masonic Hall (c. 1890).  The Cochran Memorial United Methodist Church is located in the district and listed separately.

It was added to the National Register of Historic Places in 1997.

Gallery

References

Historic districts on the National Register of Historic Places in Pennsylvania
Historic districts in Fayette County, Pennsylvania
National Register of Historic Places in Fayette County, Pennsylvania